The 2023 Ohio State Buckeyes men's volleyball team represents Ohio State University in the 2023 NCAA Division I & II men's volleyball season. The Buckeyes, led by fourth year head coach Kevin Burch, play their home games at Covelli Center. The Buckeyes are members of the Midwestern Intercollegiate Volleyball Association and were picked to finish third in the MIVA in the preseason poll.

Roster

Schedule

 *-Indicates conference match.
 Times listed are Eastern Time Zone.

Broadcasters
Central State: Greg Franke
Penn State: Greg Franke & Hanna Williford
George Mason: Jon Linney
Maryville: 
Missouri S&T: 
Princeton: 
Princeton: 
McKendree: 
Lewis: 
Purdue Fort Wayne: 
Loyola Chicago: 
Quincy: 
Lindenwood: 
Charleston: 
BYU: 
BYU: 
Ball State: 
Ball State: 
Penn State: 
Lindenwood: 
Quincy: 
Lewis: 
McKendree: 
Purdue Fort Wayne: 
Loyola Chicago:

Rankings 

^The media did not release a pre-season or Week 1 poll.

Honors
To be filled in upon completion of the season.

References

2023 in sports in Ohio
2023 NCAA Division I & II men's volleyball season
2023 team
Ohio State